The Men's sprint competition at the 2021 UCI Track Cycling World Championships was held on 23 and 24 October 2021.

Results

Qualifying
The qualifying was started on 23 October at 12:24. The top four riders advanced directly to the 1/8 finals; places 5 to 28 advance to the 1/16 final.

1/16 finals
The 1/16 finals were started on 23 October at 12:47. Each heat winner advanced to the 1/8 finals.

1/8 finals
The 1/8 finals were started on 23 October at 14:17. Each heat winner advanced to the quarterfinals.

Quarterfinals
The quarterfinals were started on 23 October at 17:52. Matches were be raced in a best-of-three format hereon; winners proceeded to the semifinals.

Semifinals
The semifinals were started on 24 October at 13:00. Matches were raced in a best-of-three format hereon; winners proceeded to the final, losers to the bronze medal race.

Finals
The finals were started on 24 October at 14:27. Matches were raced in a best-of-three format hereon.

See also
2021 UCI Track Cycling World Championships – Women's sprint

References

Men's sprint